Roberto Gil Esteve (30 July 1938 – 5 August 2022) was a Spanish professional football player and coach.

Career
Born in Paterna, Gil played as a midfielder for Valencia Mestalla, Valencia and Calvo Sotelo. He served as captain of Valencia.

As a coach he managed Gandía, Real Jaén, Levante, Valencia and Castellón. He also worked as a director at Valencia.

References

1938 births
2022 deaths
Spanish footballers
Valencia CF Mestalla footballers
Valencia CF players
CD Puertollano footballers
Segunda División players
La Liga players
Association football midfielders
Spanish football managers
CF Gandía managers
Real Jaén managers
Levante UD managers
Valencia CF managers
CD Castellón managers
Valencia CF non-playing staff
People from Horta Oest
Sportspeople from the Province of Valencia
Segunda División B managers